Aunt Frieda is a 1965 West German historical comedy film directed by Werner Jacobs and starring Elisabeth Flickenschildt, Hans Kraus and Gustav Knuth. It is based on the 1907 novel Tante Frieda by Ludwig Thoma.

The film's sets were designed by the art director Wolf Englert.

Cast

References

Bibliography

External links

1965 films
West German films
German historical comedy films
1960s German-language films
Films directed by Werner Jacobs
Films based on German novels
Films set in the 1880s
Films set in Bavaria
1960s historical comedy films
Constantin Film films
1965 comedy films
1960s German films